The Civil War Memorial in Savannah, Georgia, is a monument honoring soldiers who died during the American Civil War. Two bronze busts commemorating notable Confederate army officers flank the monument, which is protected by a railing, one of the only two that still stand around a monument, the other being the Casimir Pulaski Monument in Monterey Square. Originally known as the Confederate Monument, it was dedicated in 1875 to honor Confederate soldiers who died during the Civil War. Following the Unite the Right rally (in Charlottesville, Virginia in August 2017), the city of Savannah renamed and rededicated the structure in 2018. The monument is one of the oldest and largest Confederate monuments in Georgia.

History

Background and dedication 

The idea for a public Confederate memorial in Savannah, Georgia began to gain traction in 1869, shortly after the relocation of Georgian soldiers killed at the Battle of Gettysburg to Laurel Grove Cemetery. Following this, the Ladies' Memorial Association in Savannah began to hold fundraising events, such as bake sales, raising almost $25,000 for the construction of a Confederate monument. While the association originally planned for the monument to be located in the Confederate section of Laurel Grove Cemetery, they ultimately decided to erect it in Forsyth Park. This decision proved controversial with many in the general public, who pointed out that Forsyth Park was, at the time, on the outskirts of the city, but the association contended that the statue would be overshadowed by trees and surrounding architecture if it was placed in any of the squares of Savannah. A public meeting at Independent Presbyterian Church in May 1874 settled the issue of location in favor of Forsyth Park.

The association, not wanting to employ an architect from any northern states, instead commissioned Welsh-born Canadian architect Robert Reid to design the monument. In April 1873, Reid visited Savannah at the invitation of the association and agreed with the location of Forsyth Park. On June 16, 1874, the cornerstone for the monument was placed as part of a large festival that also helped to raise more funds for its completion. In addition, a time capsule was placed under the cornerstone which included, among other items, a copy of the Georgia Ordinance of Secession, a piece of a flagpole from Fort Sumter, a bronze copy of the Seal of the Confederate States, and buttons from the uniforms of Confederate States Navy commodore Josiah Tattnall III and Confederate States Army general Joseph E. Johnston. Reid was given a great deal of artistic liberty in designing the monument, with the association only requiring that it feature a "life-sized figure worthy of the honor and respect due the common Confederate soldier". In August 1873, the association agreed to a design created by Reid. Not wanting to use materials from northern states, the monument's sponsors chose sandstone from Nova Scotia and had it worked in Canada. The monument was completed by the fall of 1874 and shipped from Canada to Savannah via a British schooner to avoid transporting the monument through northern states. The ship arrived in Savannah on December 25, 1874, but an issue with customs caused a delay in the transportation of the monument to the park. By March 1875, much of the monument had been assembled, and on May 24, 1875, the dedication ceremony was held. General Johnston was the grand marshal for the ceremony, assisted by General Robert H. Anderson, who served as assistant marshal. Julian Hartridge served as the ceremony's orator, and in his speech, he compared the efforts of the Confederate soldiers to the patriots during the American Revolution, saying "[t]hey had been sacrificed alike in the defense of constitutional liberty".

The monument consisted of a  shaft on top of a  earthen base. On top of this pedestal was a life-sized statue of a woman in a robe named Silence, and at the base of the monument was another statue of a woman called Judgment. Both statues had been shipped via New York City. Despite the fanfare that had accompanied the monument's dedication, public opinion soon soured towards the monument. Many felt the statue was too ornate to represent the common soldier. Writing about the monument several decades after its unveiling, Savannah mayor and historian Thomas Gamble called the monument "a distinct disappointment" that was "too symbolic" and "lacking in charm".

Confederate Soldier statue 

In early 1878, prominent Savannah citizen George Wymberly Jones De Renne proposed replacing Silence, at his own expense, with a bronze statue of a Confederate soldier. The Ladies' Memorial Association approved this idea in March and again in April, and following this, De Renne hired New York-based architect David Richards to craft the statue. For the statue, simply called Confederate Soldier, De Renne and Richards wanted to depict a battle-worn soldier, which was rare, as few Confederate monuments at this time depicted them. Former Confederate Captain Hamilton Branch assisted Richards with the statue, sending him multiple articles of clothing he had worn in battle, as well as a rifle used during the war. According to Branch, the attire presented a soldier, "as he looked when he marched and fought, and not when he danced and fluted at home". The statue depicted the soldier at parade rest, which, according to De Renne, "indicates submission to the inevitable, without excluding the idea of manly struggle to avoid it". Richards used photos of Savannah veteran A. S. Bacon as a model. On May 22, 1879, Confederate Soldier was hoisted atop the shaft, with Silence and Judgment removed from the monument. Silence was relocated to the Confederate section of Laurel Grove Cemetery, while Judgment was sent to Thomasville, Georgia to be used as part of that town's Civil War memorial.

Additional memorials 

In 1910, two bronze busts honoring Confederate generals were moved next to the monument. The busts, of Lafayette McLaws and Francis S. Bartow were moved from Chippewa Square in Savannah to make way for the James Oglethorpe Monument.

Renaming and other proposed alterations 
Following the Unite the Right rally in Charlottesville, Virginia, the City of Savannah announced the creation of the Confederate Memorial Task Force on October 30, 2017. The task force's operations consisted of historic research, observational fieldwork, and a public survey to decide what, if anything, to change about the monument. The culmination of these efforts were eight recommendations published in a report on December 22, 2017. On February 14, these recommendations were adopted by the city council. This included the relocation of the two busts to Laurel Grove Cemetery and renaming the monument from "Confederate Monument" to "Civil War Memorial". A bronze plaque was also to be added that would read, “This memorial was originally erected in 1875 to the Confederate dead, redesigned in 1879, and rededicated in 2018 to all the dead of the American Civil War.”

On April 26, 2019, Governor Brian Kemp signed into effect Georgia SB77, which explicitly stated, "A monument shall not be relocated to a museum, cemetery, or mausoleum unless it was originally placed at such location." This effectively delayed the implementation of most of the task force's recommendations. On June 18, 2020, the Savannah–Chatham County Historic Site and Monument Commission held a special meeting on the subject of the Civil War Memorial and passed a motion to send a letter in support of the task force recommendations and necessary budget allocations to the city council.

Vandalism 

On June 10, 2020, during the nationwide George Floyd protests, the bust of McLaws was vandalized, with a white hood placed over the bust and a raised fist spray painted on the pedestal. Following the incident, a descendant of McLaws offered to buy and remove the statue from the park.

Almost a month later, on July 9, Silence in Laurel Grove Cemetery was vandalized, with the words “Silence–No More” spray painted on the statue. In late September, the main monument, as well as the busts and nearby sidewalk, were graffitied in response to the shooting of Breonna Taylor.

See also 
 1875 in art
Removal of Confederate monuments and memorials

References

Bibliography

Further reading

External links 
 

1874 establishments in Georgia (U.S. state)
Bronze sculptures in Georgia (U.S. state)
Confederate States of America monuments and memorials in Georgia
Monuments and memorials in Savannah, Georgia
Sandstone buildings in the United States
Vandalized works of art in Georgia (U.S. state)